The Twenty-sixth Amendment may refer to the:

Twenty-sixth Amendment to the United States Constitution — provides that the right to vote may not be denied on account of age, by any state or by the United States, to any American citizen age 18 or older.
Twenty-sixth Amendment of the Constitution of Ireland — permitted the state to ratify the Nice Treaty.
Twenty-sixth Amendment to the Constitution of India — 28 December 1971, abolition of privy purse paid to former rulers of princely states which were incorporated into the Indian Republic